The Kristet Utseende (loosely translated: The Christian Appearance, alternatively The Of Christian Appearance or The Looking like Christians) is a Swedish punk/metal-group with roots in parts around Gnarp between Sundsvall and Hudiksvall. The group themselves have said that their genre is "Narcotic Gay Metal".

The Kristet Utseendes music is inspired by bands such as Misfits, Metallica and Thomas Di Leva. Those influences began to show when they left their demo period and received a recording contract by the Swedish record company Eggtapes & records. On the old demo recordings there was an undistorted pop sound through and through. The lyrics deal with homosexuality, drug liberalism, Christianity and mysticism. The band managed to complete several tours and to release three full-length records and an EP-record before they split up after a final farewell gig on the Hultsfred Festival in 1999.

In 2005 the band reunited and performed on the Hultsfred Festival as well as on Augustibuller (literally: August noise), Piteå dansar och ler (literally: Piteå dances and smiles), Sundsvalls gatufest (literally: Sundsvall's street party), Arvika Festival and in Lund.
This time there were no longer gigs in exchange for beer and distilled beverages; instead they had a well thought-out concept which they followed. This was because the band members had become more responsible individuals and that some of them had gotten their own families.

On 25 May 2006 The Kristet Utseende released their new album Sieg Hallelujah on the Black Lodge record company. The single Inferno Pervers landed in third place at the Swedish single charts.

Members

In the beginning
First line-up
 Jesper Forselius (drums)
 Mikael Höglund (bass)
 Jörgen Fahlberg (electric guitar / vocals)
 Michel Lansink (electric guitar)

Second line-up
 Peter Selin (drums)
 Janne Wiklund (bass)
 Jörgen Fahlberg (electric guitar / vocals)
 Michel Lansink (electric guitar)

After the reunion
 Jörgen Fahlberg (vocals)
 Janne Wiklund (electric guitar)
 Michel Lansink (electric guitar)
 Magnus Bergström (bass)
 Erik Barthold (drums)

Discography

Albums

*Did not chart originally in its year of release. Charted in 2013 upon re-release.

Compilation albums

Mini CDs
2006: Under kemiska änglars vingar (literally: Under the wings of chemical angels)

Live DVDs
2007: Frälsningsprocessens andliga Inferno (literally: The spiritual inferno of the salvation process)

Singles

Side projects
 Praetorian Platoon
 Sohr
 Left Hand Solution
 Mondo Gnarp
 Raptor
 Aftermath
 BLOD

References

External links
The Kristet Utseende - Official Homepage (Swedish lang.)

Swedish musical groups